Bellingham Bridge is a stone bridge across the River North Tyne at Bellingham in Northumberland, England.

History
The bridge, which has four stone arches, was built by John Green and completed in 1834. It is a Grade II listed structure.

References

Bridges in Northumberland
Crossings of the River Tyne
Grade II listed bridges
Grade II listed buildings in Northumberland
Bridge